{{Speciesbox
| image = 
| image_caption = 
| genus = Atholus
| species = coelestis
| authority = (Marseul, 1857)
| synonyms = * Hister coelestis Marseul,1857
 Hister (Atholus) coelestis Desbordes, 1921
 Atholus coelestis Hisamatsu & Kusui,1984
 Atholus (Euatholus) coelestls Hisamatsu & Kusui, l984
 Atholus (Euatholus) coelestes' [sic] Hisamatsu, 1985
 Hister femoralis Motschulsky, 1863
}}Atholus coelestis''''', is a species of clown beetle found in Indo-Pacific regional countries such as Tajikistan, India, Sri Lanka, Nepal, China, Japan, Taiwan, Indochina, Java, Philippines, Indonesia, Celebes and Comores.

Description
Male is about 2.57 to 3.81 mm, whereas female is 3.09 to 3.57 mm in length. Body oval, and feebly depressed. Body color is black with shine. Tibiae, tarsi and antennae are reddish brown. Frontal stria of head is complete and carinate. The disk is densely covered with coarse punctures. Epipleura1 fossette of elytra sparsely clothed with fine punctures. Marginal epipleural stria and External subhumera1 stria are absent. Marginal elytra1 stria complete and deeply impressed. Pygidium with alutaceous ground sculpture. Propygidium sparsely and irregularly scattered with coarse punctures. Presternal keel is narrow and without carina1 stria.

References

Histeridae
Insects of Sri Lanka
Insects described in 1857